"" is the twelfth Japanese single release from Hitomi Yaida. It is also the second single released from the album Here Today – Gone Tomorrow.

It included the CD-Extra PV for Monochrome Letter, with a limited edition release also including photos from two tours entitled Yaiko/Rocks/50Rounds & Girls Talk 2004 Digest.

The single reached number seven in the charts on November 6, 2004

Track listing

Notes

2004 singles
Hitomi Yaida songs
Songs written by Hitomi Yaida
2004 songs